The Thrissur Motor Show is  South India’s largest student organized motor show held annually in Thrissur city, Kerala, India. The show is an exhibition of luxury, vintage and modified cars and motor bikes . The expo is organized at Thekkinkadu Maidan and  organized by Mechanical Engineering Department of Government Engineering College, Thrissur.

Government Engineering College Thrissur
Government Engineering College Thrissur is an engineering college situated in Thrissur city of Kerala, India. It is the second oldest engineering college established in Kerala and the first engineering college to be established after the formation of Kerala state. The college is affiliated to the APJ Abdul Kalam Technological University.

Milestones

References

Culture of Thrissur
Auto shows in India
Entertainment events in India
Automotive industry in India